The following is a list of Serbian basketball players that play or have played in the National Basketball Association (NBA). 

Center Vlade Divac and forward Žarko Paspalj were the first Serbian players to play in the NBA, in the 1989–90 season. In 2004, Darko Miličić became the first basketball player from Serbia to win an NBA championship. Since then, Predrag Stojaković, Ognjen Kuzmić, and Nemanja Bjelica won the league in 2011, 2015, and 2022, respectively. 

In 2019, Vlade Divac became the first Serb to be included in the Naismith Memorial Basketball Hall of Fame as a player. 

Nikola Jokić is the Serbian player with most NBA honours and is the first Serb, and only the third European, to win the NBA Most Valuable Player Award. In 2022, Jokić was named the NBA MVP for the second year in a row, becoming the 13th player to win the award in consecutive seasons, as well as the second European player to win the award more than once, joining Giannis Antetokounmpo.

Active players
The following is a list of current NBA players.

Former players
The following is a list of former NBA players.

Players who are still active overseas

Drafted players

The following is a list of drafted players who have never appeared in an NBA regular season or playoff game.

Undrafted Summer League players
The following is a list of undrafted players who have never appeared in an NBA regular season or playoff game, but have played in the NBA Summer League.

Players with Serbian citizenship or parentage 
The following is a list of players, that play or have played in the NBA, who have citizenship of Serbia or Serbian parentage or who are Serbs of former Yugoslav republics (Bosnia and Herzegovina, Croatia, Montenegro, North Macedonia, Slovenia).

See also 
 List of European basketball players in the United States
 List of National Basketball Association players by country
 List of Croatian NBA players
 List of Montenegrin NBA players
 List of Serbian WNBA players
 List of Serbian NBA coaches

Notes 
Details

Other nationalities, ethnic groups

References 

basketball

Serbia
NBA players